Tintorettor Jishu (Tintoretto's Jesus) is a mystery novel by Satyajit Ray about an adventure of Feluda. A movie directed by Sandip Ray has been made based on the story (released in December 2008). An extensive shoot schedule at Hong Kong during May 2008 takes Feluda movies to a new height. The book was published by Ananda Publishers in 1983.

Plot summary
A famous painting by the Italian maestro Tintoretto is gifted to the Niyogi family by the aristocratic Italian Cassini family. However, not everyone is aware of the value of the painting. One of the family members(disguised) steals it, and international buyers are interested in it. Feluda chases the criminals all the way to Hong Kong. There was a surprise waiting for him there.  Eventually, Feluda (with the help of a relative stranger, who turns out to be a Niyogi family member) succeeds in solving the mystery.

Feluda and the former Maharajas

The native princes play an interesting part in the history of British India. Though under the protection of the British Raj, they had a certain amount of power within their domain. Apart from patronizing cricket in India, many of them were involved in promoting social and cultural activities in India.

In 'Tintorettor Jishu' we meet the (fictional) former Maharaja of Bhagwanagarh, Mr. Bhudev Singh. Another former Maharaja Suraj Singh appears in 'Golapi Mukta Rahashya'. The young prince of Rupnaryangarh plays an important role in 'Eber Kando Kedarnathe'. However, the maharajas and the princes are more prominent in the 'Tarini Khuro' series, another creation of Satyajit Ray.

Adaptation

A film based on this novel was released in 2008, directed by Sandip Ray.

References

External links
 Official website of film
 Tintorettor Jishu: was there such a painting?

Novels by Satyajit Ray
1983 novels
Feluda (series)
Novels set in India
Novels set in Hong Kong
Indian novels adapted into films
1983 Indian novels
Tintoretto